Social Atlético Televisión, commonly known as SAT, is an Argentine sports club situated in Moreno, Buenos Aires Province. Its women's football team is currently playing their debut season in the Campeonato Femenino. Other sports hosted at the club are men's football, cycling, archery, Taekwondo, rugby union, and volleyball.

Women's football
SAT were formed in 2017 and the women's team competed in Primera B (the second tier of women's football in Argentina) until their promotion at the end of the 2018-19. SAT are playing their first season in the Campeonato Femenino in 2019-20. In September 2019, SAT – for the first time – signed players on professional contracts. The squad currently consists of 26 players, eight of whom are on professional contracts.

References

External links
Official website

Sports clubs in Buenos Aires